Lawrence Grey (March 23, 1895 – May 5, 1951) was an English magician known for his card tricks. He also worked as an occasional actor and is known for voicing Bill the Lizard in Walt Disney's Alice in Wonderland.

Biography

Larry Grey was born on March 23, 1895 in Leeds, West Riding of Yorkshire, England. In his youth, he emigrated to the United States, where he began practising magic. One of his earliest tricks included Jumbo Cards, which inspired many of his later card tricks.

Around 1918, Grey met Dai Vernon in Coney Island. At the time, Grey had just begun his career in magic but with little success and was only just managing to make a living. Grey and Vernon decided to work together, initially setting up a booth along Kengsington Walk, in which Grey would sell small packs of cards and magic props while Vernon would cut silhouettes. During this time Vernon and Grey lived together in a room on Coney Island. Vernon later taught him how to cut silhouettes and they both worked together cutting silhouettes at the Toronto Exhibition in 1919 and at a booth in New York City in the 1920s. In 1926 Grey and Vernon set up the Sleight-of-Hand Artists Club, their meetings were held in their Silhouette Studio on Broadway.

After meeting Vernon, Grey began to develop his performance style. His routines were often comedic and fast paced. He was best known under his stage name, "The Dizzy Wizard", due to his zany personality. He eventually earned moderate success amongst magicians and was particularly noted for his card and sleight of hand magic. In 1940, he married Carlotta Dale Garrison, who performed alongside her husband as a singer.

In 1941, Grey appeared in the film, Mr. Celebrity, as himself performing magic tricks with Jumbo Cards. The film was about vaudeville performers performing in a boarding house. He also appeared in a few other films during his lifetime.

Near the end of his life, Grey had his own magic theater.
on the boardwalk at Santa Cruz, California, and did a comedy magic act with his wife. He also made his most famous film appearance in Walt Disney’s Alice in Wonderland in 1951 as the voice of Bill the Lizard. The film was released two months after his death.

Death and legacy
On May 5, 1951, three hours before he was due to perform a magic show in San Francisco, Grey died, aged 56, after shooting himself in the head with a .38 caliber revolver three doors down from his home in Oakland, California. He left a series of suicide notes found in a suitcase near his body which explained that he "couldn't go on any longer". According to his wife Carlotta, Grey had been depressed because his career had declined and he felt "washed up" in show business.

His death was greatly mourned, especially by his good friend Dai Vernon, who said he was, "One of the greatest card performers who ever lived". Grey is mentioned frequently in columns written for the Genii magazine by Vernon.

Filmography
Mr. Celebrity (1941) - Larry 'Gardo the Great' Grey
Alice in Wonderland (1951) - Bill, The Lizard (voice)

References

External links

Larry Grey on Magicpedia, an external wiki

Male actors from Leeds
English emigrants to the United States
English magicians
1951 deaths
1895 births
English male comedians
English male voice actors
Suicides by firearm in California
Card magic
Sleight of hand
20th-century English comedians
1951 suicides